Karachi Water and Sewerage Board (KWSB) is responsible for production, transmission and distribution of potable water to the citizens of Karachi, Sindh, Pakistan.

History 
Karachi Joint Water Board constituted in 1953 was the first body which was created to expand Karachi water supply system from the Indus River it was transferred to the KDA in 1957 after its formation. Since the KMC handled some of the affairs of retailing and distribution of treated water and other responsibilities which were co shared with 22 other separate agencies, there was a need to unify all of the functions under one body and hence in 1981, Karachi Water Management Board (KWMB) was created which was given both distribution and cost recovery powers. KMC was still responsible for its revenue and sewerage maintenance, hence KWMB was upgraded to KWSB in 1983 under the Mayor, Abdul Sattar Afghani on the advice of World Bank. It was placed under Government of Sindh but its board of directors was mayor of Karachi. In 1996, KWSB was separated from KMC and was brought back under mayor supervision in 2001  until it was separated again under new SLGO 2013 act.

Karachi Bulk Water Supply Project

See also 
Water supply and sanitation in Pakistan
 K-IV water project
 Karachi Water and Sewerage Board
 Karachi Bulk Water Supply Project
 Water resources management in Pakistan
 Dams, water locks and canals of Pakistan

References

External links
 

Water companies of Pakistan
Government of Karachi